During the 1915–16 season Hearts competed in the Scottish First Division and the East of Scotland Shield.

Fixtures

Wilson Cup

Rosebery Charity Cup

Scottish First Division

See also
List of Heart of Midlothian F.C. seasons

References

Statistical Record 15-16

External links
Official Club website

Heart of Midlothian F.C. seasons
Heart of Midlothian